Nigel Seton Avery (born 31 August 1967) is a former weightlifting competitor for New Zealand. He was born in Auckland.

At the 1998 Commonwealth Games in Kuala Lumpur he won a bronze medal in the 105+ kg snatch and the 105+ kg combined total.

He went to the 2002 Commonwealth Games in Manchester where he 2 gold medals in the 105+ kg clean and jerk and 105+ kg combined total, and gained a silver medal in the 105+ kg snatch. He was the Closing Ceremony flag bearer for New Zealand.

He competed at the 2000 Olympic Games in Sydney placing 17th in the 105+ kg men.

From 1991 to 1996, he was a member of the New Zealand bobsleigh team.

Nigel Avery is the father to three daughters. He is married to former athlete Shelley Avery.

He has appeared on the TV One programme Downsize Me! to show the effect of a high-fat diet on a very fit person.

References

External links

Living people
1967 births
New Zealand male weightlifters
New Zealand male bobsledders
Commonwealth Games gold medallists for New Zealand
Commonwealth Games silver medallists for New Zealand
Commonwealth Games bronze medallists for New Zealand
Weightlifters at the 1998 Commonwealth Games
Weightlifters at the 2002 Commonwealth Games
Olympic weightlifters of New Zealand
Weightlifters at the 2000 Summer Olympics
Sportspeople from Auckland
Commonwealth Games medallists in weightlifting
20th-century New Zealand people
Medallists at the 1998 Commonwealth Games
Medallists at the 2002 Commonwealth Games